Archie Goodwin (born 7 November 2004) is an Australian professional soccer player who plays as a striker for Newcastle Jets.

Club career

Newcastle Jets

2020–21
In 2020, after four years progressing through the ranks of the Newcastle Jets Academy, Goodwin began training with the club's first team at the age of 16. He would then go on to make his A-League senior debut in February 2021 as a substitute in a 1–0 win over Melbourne Victory. At 16 years, 106 days old Goodwin was the clubs youngest first team player in history and impressed as he played 9 minutes and made one shot with his first touch of the match.

Goodwin continued training with the first team, however the return of multiple players from injury made it difficult for him to play regularly for the Jets. On 14 May, together with fellow youth player Blake Archbold, he signed a one-year scholarship contract with the club.

In May, with four matches remaining in the regular season Newcastle were positioned last on the table amid a club record winless streak. On 21 May, Goodwin was recalled to the matchday squad as a substitute, and after coming on at half-time his performance lifted the Jets attack back to life as the side fought for a winner. Newcastle ultimately lost the match, but Goodwin's energy and dribbling led to repeated applause from the crowd within Mcdonald Jones Stadium.

Goodwin would make his starting debut a week later in the F3 Derby against Central Coast Mariners. He assisted the Jets first goal as Newcastle won the derby 2–0, the teams first win since Goodwin's debut. Goodwin started the remaining two matches of the regular season as the Jets continued their unbeaten streak by drawing with Perth Glory and beating eventual champions Melbourne City, he scored his first professional goal against the latter as Newcastle avoided finishing last.

2021–22
Under new manager Arthur Papas, Goodwin began his second A-League Men season with Newcastle Jets as he adjusted to the attacking style of play introduced by the new coach. He was unavailable for the first-half of the 2021–22 season as Papas placed an emphasis on managing his development sustainably.

Goodwin made his first appearance of the season on Matchday 20 against Sydney FC at Mcdonald Jones Stadium. The seventeen year old started at striker in place of the ill Beka Mikeltadze. Goodwin produced a man of the match winning performance by scoring two goals as the Jets beat Sydney 2–0.

Career statistics

References

External links

2004 births
Living people
Australian soccer players
Association football forwards
Newcastle Jets FC players
A-League Men players